The Middlesex–Winooski River Bridge is a steel girder bridge carrying U.S. Route 2 (US 2) across the Winooski River in a rural area on the town line between Moretown and Middlesex, Vermont. The two-span bridge was built in 2010, replacing a 1928 three-span Pratt through truss, which was listed on the National Register of Historic Places in 1991.

Setting
The Middlesex–Winooski River Bridge is located northwest of the village center of Middlesex, in the Winooski River floodplain. The river flows north at the crossing, ultimately heading northwesterly to Burlington and Lake Champlain. The bridge is set at an angle on concrete abutments and pier, with an orientation from southeast to northwest. The bridge was built in 2010.

Historic bridge
The historic bridge was set in a similar orientation to the modern bridge. It had two long spans, each , carried by Pratt through trusses, and short  girder span at the north end. The bridge trusses were fabricated by the American Bridge Company and the bridge was completed in 1928. In 1927, this part of the Winooski River watershed was subjected some of the state's most devastating flooding. US 2 was at that time the principal road artery between Burlington and Montpelier, and many bridges (both highway and railroad) were either swept away or suffered significant damage, resulting in the isolation of Middlesex village. The 1928 bridge was built as part of the state's crash program to build more than 1,200 bridges.

See also
 
 
 
 
 List of bridges on the National Register of Historic Places in Vermont
 National Register of Historic Places listings in Washington County, Vermont

References

Bridges on the National Register of Historic Places in Vermont
National Register of Historic Places in Washington County, Vermont
Bridges completed in 1928
Bridges in Washington County, Vermont
Buildings and structures in Middlesex, Vermont
U.S. Route 2
Bridges of the United States Numbered Highway System
Steel bridges in the United States
Girder bridges in the United States
Pratt truss bridges in the United States
Road bridges in Vermont
1928 establishments in Vermont